Abriel may refer to:

 Abriel (band), an American band
 Fabrice Abriel (born 1979), French football player
 Abriel Nei Debrusc Borl Paryun Lafiel, a fictional character from Banner of the Stars